Smile is the debut album by Swedish pop band Smile.dk. The album sold gold in Japan, and Smile.dk received "Best International Girl Group" in Hong Kong in 1998.

Track listing
All songs written and produced by Robert Uhlmann and Robin Rex.
 "Butterfly" – 2:58
 "Coconut" – 3:23
 "Sweet Senorita" – 3:10
 "Middle of the Night" – 3:24
 "Tic Toc" – 3:00
 "Get Out" – 3:12
 "Boys" – 3:06
 "Mr. Wonderful" – 3:14
 "Knock Knock" – 3:16
 "Comme Ci Comme Ca" – 3:03
 "Happy In Love" (Japan/Malaysia bonus track) – 3:26

References

1998 debut albums
Smile.dk albums
EMI Music Japan albums